Sagara Sangamam is a 1983 Indian Telugu-language dance film written and directed by K. Viswanath and produced by Edida Nageswara Rao. The film stars Kamal Haasan, Jaya Prada, Sarath Babu, S. P. Sailaja and Chakri Toleti. Upon release, the film received positive reviews and became a box office hit. The film has received two National Film Awards, three Filmfare Awards South and the Nandi Award for Best Feature Film (Bronze). The film is listed among CNN-IBN's list of 100 greatest Indian films of all time.

The film was dubbed into Tamil and Malayalam and released as Salangai Oli and Sagara Sangamam respectively. Kamal Haasan had lent his voice for all three versions. The film was screened at the International Film Festival of India in 1984, retrospective in 2011 and Celebrating Dance in Indian cinema section in 2014. The film was dubbed into Russian, and was screened at the Moscow International Film Festival, Asia Pacific Film Festival and AISFM Film Festival. Salangai Oli was released on the same day as Sagara Sangamam.

Plot
Balakrishna, fondly called Balu, is an economically disadvantaged but multi-talented dancer, adept at the Indian classical dances of Kuchipudi, Bharatanatyam, Kathak, etc. His simple and very honest soul does not permit him to attain professional success in the commercial world that requires a certain level of moral laxness. Madhavi, a wealthy young woman and a dance patron, notices his talent and acts as his benefactor, helping him secure an opportunity to participate in a high-level classical dance festival.

Balu's aging mother passes away from the afflictions of poverty, two days before his performance. Balu, who was very attached to her, is emotionally devastated and fails to participate in the dance festival. Madhavi nevertheless, gives him support and encouragement and sets him on the mend. Balu gradually develops a fondness for Madhavi as their relationship grows. He hides his love for her but eventually picks up the courage to express it. Balu discovers that, while Madhavi shares his feelings, she is a married woman separated from her husband. Her husband later returns to unite Madhavi and Balu, but Balu decides to sacrifice his love, showing respect for the institution of marriage.

Years pass, and Balu, a disappointed man, has become an inconsolable alcoholic and a newspaper journalist/art critic. Once he critiques a dancer, Sailaja, for a lack of concentration on her form and more towards the audience, which results in them having a fight. The article is in-turn read by Madhavi, who turns out to be Sailaja's mother, and has lost her husband. She finds out about Balu, his medical condition, never ending love for her, and her family. In a bid to revive his will to live and his passion for his art, she tends to his medical needs through his friend, Raghu, and solicits Balu to be the dance instructor for her daughter. She does not come in front of him, worried that he would not be able to cope with the news of her being a widow. However, a situation arises where she saves him from falling into a well. She comes in front of him wearing a bhindi. He later learns the truth about her husband and his condition deteriorates.

The film ends with Sailaja's on-stage performance with Balu watching her in a wheelchair, his health completely deteriorated. He dies while watching her performance. A heartbroken Raghu takes him away quietly, without interrupting the performance. Madhavi, devastated, follows them with an umbrella, covering Balu from the rain.

Cast
 Kamal Haasan as Balakrishna "Balu"
 Jaya Prada as Madhavi
 Sarath Babu as Ragupathy
 S. P. Sailaja as Sailaja, Madhavi's daughter
 Sakshi Ranga Rao as Balu's uncle
 Dubbing Janaki as Balu's mother
 Chakri Toleti as Teen photographer
 Potti Prasad as Madhavi's servant
 S. K. Misro as Film choreographer
 Manju Bhargavi as Classical dancer
 Geetha as Dance assistant
 Mohan Sharma as Venugopala Rathnam, Madhavi's husband

Production
Kamal and R. C. Sakthi wanted to make a film on a subject, about a dancer who was an alcoholic, which they named "Anupallavi" when K. Viswanath approached him with a similar subject, Kamal felt he had to do the film. On the sets of the film, Gopi Krishna, one of the choreographers, insisted that Kamal should train for at least a month. Kamal was one of the top stars of the time, doing multiple shifts, and had to find the time. Kamal said it was the "greatest sacrifice from my side". Playback singer S. P. Sailaja was recruited to play a prominent role, thereby making her debut as an actress and it also remains the only film she had acted in so far. K. Viswanath who is related to Sailaja, decided that she would fit perfectly in the role of Kamal Haasan's pupil, after seeing the photos. Sailaja recalled: "I was reluctant as I was trained only in Bharatanatyam, but in the film I had to perform other dance forms like Kathak too. While shooting my introductory song "Om Namah Shivaya" at Ravindra Bharathi, I became nervous on the stage and refused to act". Chakri Toleti did the role of a photographer boy in the film. Thotta Tharani said that the budget was drastically cut for the song in which Kamal dances on the well.

Soundtrack
The film score and soundtrack was composed by Ilaiyaraaja . The lyrics for the Telugu version were written by Veturi, while Vairamuthu has written the lyrics for the Tamil version and Sreekumaran Thampi for Malayalam version. The song "Vedam Anuvanavuna" is based on Hamsanandi Raga. The song "Om Nama Sivaya" is based on Hindolam Raga. The song "Naada Vinodam" is based on Shree ranjani Raga. The song "Balakanakamaya" is based on a Thyagaraja kirtana and was composed on Atana raga . The song "Thakita Thadimi" is based on Shanmukhapriya Raga . "Vevela Gopemmala" is based on Mohanam raga and "Mounamelanoyi Ee Marapurani Reyi" is based on Pahadi raga .

Sagara Sangamam (Original soundtrack)

Salangai Oli (Tamil soundtrack)

Sagara Sangamam (Malayalam soundtrack)

Release and reception
Sagara Sangamam was released on 3 June 1983. The film had a highly successful run in the theatres; it ultimately ended as a box-office success.  The Tamil version Salangai Oli was released on the same day as Sagara Sangamam and successful run in the theatres. This is the first film that ran more than 100 days in 4 Indian southern states of Andhra, Karnataka, Tamil Nadu, and Kerala. The film is listed among CNN-IBN's list of 100 greatest Indian films of all time.

Awards and recognitions 
The film was screened at the International Film Festival of India in 1984. The film was dubbed into Russian, and was screened at the Moscow International Film Festival, Asia Pacific Film Festival and AISFM Film Festival.

References

External links

1983 films
Films directed by K. Viswanath
1980s dance films
1983 romantic drama films
1980s romantic musical films
1980s Telugu-language films
Indian dance films
Films about the arts
Films about alcoholism
Films about social issues in India
Indian nonlinear narrative films
Films shot in Ooty
Indian romantic musical films
Films scored by Ilaiyaraaja
Films shot in Visakhapatnam
Indian romantic drama films
Films shot in Hyderabad, India
Films set in Andhra Pradesh
Films shot in Andhra Pradesh
Indian musical drama films
Indian musical films
Indian drama films